Bellastraea rutidoloma, common name the granular small star, is a species of sea snail, a marine gastropod mollusk in the family Turbinidae, the turban snails.

Description
(Original description by R. Tate) The shell has a lenticular-conoid shape, about equally sloping above and below from the angular periphery. The 4½ whorls are flat. The embryonic contains 1½ whorls fimbriated at the suture. The umbilicus is minute. The upper surface of the body whorl shows a stout and a broad lira next to the suture, which is transversely crenulate-ridged. The periphery is bluntly angled by a slightly compressed convex keel, which is obsoletely crenulated. Between the keel and the sutural band are three granulose lirae about equidistant and equal-sized but the anterior one is close to the keel (in older specimens a small lira is interposed next the suture, and there is a tendency in the granules of the lirae to become somewhat confluent). The intervals between the lirae are smooth. The base has four granulose lirae. The umbilical region is bounded by a broad ridge, which is broken up into claviform tubercles obliquely disposed. The colour is greenish-brown in living specimens, flesh-coloured with rufous lirae and darker tinted at the suture and keel in beach examples. The interior of the aperture of living examples is greenish and of a pearly lustre.

Distribution
This marine species is endemic to Australia and occurs off South Australia.

References

 Cotton, B.C. 1959. South Australian Mollusca. Archaeogastropoda. Handbook of the Flora and Fauna of South Australia. Adelaide : South Australian Government Printer 449 pp
 Williams, S.T. (2007). Origins and diversification of Indo-West Pacific marine fauna: evolutionary history and biogeography of turban shells (Gastropoda, Turbinidae). Biological Journal of the Linnean Society, 2007, 92, 573–592.
 Alf A. & Kreipl K. (2011) The family Turbinidae. Subfamilies Turbininae Rafinesque, 1815 and Prisogasterinae Hickman & McLean, 1990. In: G.T. Poppe & K. Groh (eds), A Conchological Iconography. Hackenheim: Conchbooks. pp. 1–82, pls 104–245.

External links

Turbinidae
Gastropods described in 1893